Aioloceras is an ammonite, order Ammonitida, from near the end of the Early Cretaceous. The shell is compressed with the outer whorl covering much of the previous. Sides are slightly convex, converge toward a narrowly ached venter. Inner whorls have sharp falcoid ribs, outer are smooth. Umbilical tubercles are lacking. Similar related forms include Neosaynella and Cleoniceras.

Aioloceras has been found in Albian (uL Cret) sediments in 
Madagascar, Patagonia, and possibly Queensland.

References
Mesozoic Ammonoidea, Arkell et al; Treatise on Invertebrate Paleontology, Part L. Geol Soc of America (1957) p. L394.

Early Cretaceous ammonites
Prehistoric animals of Madagascar
Hoplitidae
Ammonite genera